"Canción Mixteca" is a Mexican folk song written by Oaxacan composer José López Alavez (1889–1974). Lopez Alavez wrote the melody of the song in 1912, and composed the lyrics in 1915. Lopez Alavez describes his feelings of homesickness for his home region of Oaxaca after moving to Mexico City. In modern times, the song has become an anthem both for the region of Oaxaca and Mexican citizens living abroad who miss their homeland.

The song was used in the film Paris, Texas directed by Wim Wenders. The song was played by Ry Cooder with the lyrics being sung by Harry Dean Stanton.

Lyrics

External links
  Biography of Jose Lopez Alavez
  The culture of migration in Southern Mexico
  The eagle and the virgin: nation and cultural revolution in Mexico, 1920-1940

1912 songs
Mexican folk songs